The 2017–18 Rugby Europe Trophy is the second-level rugby union competition below the premier Championship. It is the second Trophy competition under its new format, that will see Czech Republic, Moldova, Netherlands, Poland, Portugal and Switzerland compete for the title, and a place in the Championship-Trophy promotion play-off.

This year's competition sees Czech Republic joining the Trophy after winning the Trophy-Conference 1 promotion play-off against Malta. This year sees no relegated team from the Rugby Championship, after last year's winner Portugal lost the Championship-Trophy promotion play-off against Belgium.

Table

Fixtures

Relegation/Promotion play-off

Top scorers

Top points scorers

Top try scorers

See also 
 Rugby Europe International Championships
 2017–18 Rugby Europe International Championships
 Six Nations Championship
 Antim Cup

References

External links
 Rugby Europe official website

2017–18 Rugby Europe International Championships
2017-18